ABB-gymnasiet is the name of three schools in Västerås, Sala and Ludvika, Sweden, secondary schools with a focus on engineering, information technology and enterprising. The Västerås branch was started in 1994 by the industrial corporation ABB, which were merged in 1987 from the Swiss Brown Boveri Corporation and the Swedish ASEA, which is headquartered in Västerås. The Ludvika school was founded by ABB in 1995.

External links
 Official website

Education in Sweden
Västerås
Gymnasiums (school) in Sweden
Buildings and structures in Västerås
Education in Västerås